is a Japanese manga series written and illustrated by Hikaru Nikaidō. It has been serialized in Shogakukan's Weekly Shōnen Sunday since April 2016, with its chapters collected in twenty-six tankōbon volumes as of October 2022. It was adapted into a five-episode Japanese television drama broadcast on MBS from October to November 2019.

Media

Manga
Aozakura: Bōei Daigakukō Monogatari is written and illustrated by Hikaru Nikaidō. The series began in Shogakukan's Weekly Shōnen Sunday on April 27, 2016. Shogakukan has compiled its chapters into individual tankōbon volumes. The first volume was published on September 16, 2016. As of October 18, 2022, twenty-six volumes have been released.

Volume list

Drama
A 5-episode Japanese television drama was broadcast on MBS from October 31 to November 28, 2019.

References

External links
 
 

Mainichi Broadcasting System original programming
Shogakukan manga
Shōnen manga